Paraibuna is the name of two distinct tributaries of the Rio Paraiba do Sul in the South East of Brazil:

 Paraibuna River (Minas Gerais)
 Paraibuna River (Sao Paulo)